{{Infobox company
| name = FNB Namibia Holdings Limited
| logo = 
| logo_size = 150px
| caption = 
| type = Public
| traded_as = NSX: FNB
| predecessor = Merger of First National Bank Limited and Swabou
| industry = BankingFinancial services
| foundation = 
| founder = 
| location_city = 130 Independence Avenue, Windhoek
| location_country = Namibia
| key_people = Inge Zaamwani-Kamwi(Chairman)Conrad Dempsey(CEO FirstRand Holdings)Erwin Tjipuka (CEO FNB Namibia)Rodney Forbes(Executive)Nangula KaulumaExecutive| area_served = 
| products = Consumer banking, corporate banking, Financial services, investment banking, mortgage loans, private banking, private equity, wealth management, credit cards
| revenue = 
| operating_income = 
| net_income = 
| assets = 
| equity = 
| num_employees = 1800+ (2013)
| parent = First Rand
| divisions = Wesbank, RMB Namibia, Outsurance Namibia, FNB Namibian,
| subsid = 
| homepage = 
| footnotes = 
}}First National Bank (Namibia), commonly referred to as FNB Namibia', is Namibia largest commercial bank and, according to The Banker magazine of London, Namibia's best bank for the fifth consecutive year.

The financial institution has its headquarters located in Windhoek Independence Avenue. It is one of the eleven commercial banks licensed to operate in the country by the Bank of Namibia (the national banking regulator) and the first commercial bank created in the country before independence. and follows international standard in Banking and Finance.

History
FNB Namibia was founded as Deutsche Afrika Bank (DAB) in 1907, and in 1915 the National Bank of South Africa took over the assets of DAB which was in 1926 integrated with Barclays Bank. Barclays Bank changed the name of the South African operation to Barclays National Bank Limited in 1971, and later to First National Bank of Southern Africa''. After the shareholding changed in December 1987, First National Bank of SWA/Namibia Limited was incorporated in February 1988. FNB Namibia listed on the Namibia Stock Exchange in 1997 and is currently largest locally listed company with market capitalisation of N$ 1,9 billion or 39% of the NSX total market cap. The merger between FNB Namibia and Swabou happened in 2003.

First Rand Group
The First Rand Group was established in 1998, by the merger of First National Bank of South Africa, Rand Merchant Bank and Momentum Insurance & Asset Management. First Rand is listed as a "locally controlled bank" by the South African Reserve Bank, the national banking regulator. , the group had total assets valued at US$90.3+ billion (ZAR:698 billion) (2011) with subsidiaries in seven sub-Saharan countries and in Australia and India. Expansion plans in another six African countries are underway.

See also
 Bank of Namibia
 Economy of Namibia
 List of banks in Namibia

References

External links
 First National Namibia Limited official site

Banks of Namibia
Banks established in 1907
1907 establishments in German South West Africa